Blake Leigh-Smith (born 5 February 1990) is an Australian motorcycle racer. In 2009 he won the Australian 125 GP Championship. His brother, Jackson Leigh-Smith, is also a motorcycle racer.

Career statistics

Grand Prix motorcycle racing

By season

Races by year
(key)

References

External links

Australian motorcycle racers
1990 births
Living people
125cc World Championship riders
Moto2 World Championship riders